Mike Jackson is an American entrepreneur, producer, film and television studio executive. Jackson founded Get Lifted Film Co. with John Legend and Ty Stiklorius.

Get Lifted Film Co.
Under GLFC, Jackson has Executive Producer credits on NBC's Emmy winning "Jesus Christ Superstar"; Lionsgate’s Oscar nominated film, “La La Land,” written and directed by Damien Chazelle; the critically acclaimed original drama series, “Underground” on WGN.

References

External links
 

1972 births
American film producers
Living people
Primetime Emmy Award winners